Marx Beltrão Lima Siqueira (born 28 November 1979 in Maceió) is a Brazilian lawyer and politician affiliated to the Brazilian Democratic Movement (MDB), former mayor of the city of Coruripe, current federal deputy from the state of Alagoas and former minister of Tourism appointed by president Michel Temer.

References

1979 births
Living people
Ministers of Tourism of Brazil
Brazilian Democratic Movement politicians
People from Maceió
Government ministers of Brazil
21st-century Brazilian lawyers